Dennis Brunod  (born 16 June 1978 in Aosta) is an Italian ski mountaineer, mountain and skyrunner.

Life 
Born in Aosta but living in Châtillon, Brunod added ski mountaineering to his favorite sports in 2000, when he first competed in the Mountain Attack race in Saalbach. He was member of the Italian national team after 2002.

Selected results

Ski mountaineering 
 2002:
 1st, Italian Cup team (together with Manfred Reichegger)
 1st, Tour du Rutor (together with Manfred Reichegger)
 2nd, Transcavallo (together with Manfred Reichegger)
 2003:
 1st, Italian Cup team (together with Manfred Reichegger)
 2nd, European Championship team race (together with Manfred Reichegger)
 4th, European Championship combination ranking
 6th, European Championship single race
 2004:
 1st, Dolomiti Cup team (together with Manfred Reichegger)
 2nd, Transcavallo (together with Manfred Reichegger)
 3rd, World Championship single race
 3rd, World Championship team race (together with Manfred Reichegger)
 3rd, World Championship combination ranking
2005:
 1st, European Championship relay race (together with Guido Giacomelli, Manfred Reichegger and Matteo Pedergnana)
 1st, Italian Cup team (together with Manfred Reichegger)
 5th, World Cup team (together with Manfred Reichegger)
 6th, European Championship vertical race
 2006:
 1st, World Championship relay race (together with Hansjörg Lunger, Manfred Reichegger, and Guido Giacomelli)
 1st, World Cup team (together with Manfred Reichegger)
 1st, Tour du Rutor (together with Manfred Reichegger)
 3rd, World Championship team race (together with Manfred Reichegger)
 2007:
 1st, World Cup single
 1st, World Cup team (together with Federico Pedranzini)
 1st, European Championship relay race (together with Denis Trento, Manfred Reichegger and Guido Giacomelli)
 1st, Traça Catalana race
 1st, Tour du Rutor (together with Manfred Reichegger)
 2nd, European Championship single race
 3rd, European Championship combination ranking
 4th, European Championship team race (together with Manfred Reichegger)
 2008:
 1st, World Championship relay race (together with Manfred Reichegger, Denis Trento and Martin Riz)
 1st, World Cup, Val d'Aran
 2nd, World Championship vertical race
 2nd, World Championship combination ranking
 3rd, World Championship single race
 2009:
 1st, European Championship relay race (together with Lorenzo Holzknecht, Manfred Reichegger and Damiano Lenzi)
 3rd, European Championship team race (together with Manfred Reichegger)
 2010
 1st, World Championship relay race (together with Damiano Lenzi, Lorenzo Holzknecht and Manfred Reichegger)
 2nd, World Championship vertical race
 6th, World Championship team race (together with Manfred Reichegger)
 8th, World Championship combination ranking
 2nd, Trophée des Gastlosen (ISMF World Cup), together with Manfred Reichegger

Trofeo Mezzalama 

 2001: 5th, together with Nicola Invernizzi and Emanuel Conta
 2003: 3rd, together with Manfred Reichegger and Nicola Invernizzi
 2005: 3rd, together with Manfred Reichegger and Jean Pellissier
 2007: 3rd, together with Manfred Reichegger and Denis Trento

Pierra Menta 

 2004: 1st, together with Manfred Reichegger
 2009: 1st, together with Manfred Reichegger
 2010: 3rd, together with Manfred Reichegger

Mountain running / skyrunning 
Brunod won the Mezzalama Skyrace in 2004, and from 2006 to 2008.

 2001: 3rd, Sentiero 4 Luglio SkyMarathon
 2002: 1st, Sentiero 4 Luglio SkyMarathon
 2004: 1st, Valposchiavo-Valmalenco-Skyrunning (Skyrunner World Series race)
 2005: 1st, Sentiero delle Grigne-Skyrunning (SkyRunner World Series race)

External links 
 Dennis Brunod at Skimountaineering.org

References 

1978 births
Living people
People from Aosta
Italian male ski mountaineers
World ski mountaineering champions
Ski mountaineers of Gruppo Sportivo Esercito
Italian male mountain runners
Italian sky runners
Sportspeople from Aosta Valley